Mayland's rainbowfish (Melanotaenia maylandi) is a species of rainbowfish in the subfamily Melanotaeniinae. It is endemic to West Papua in Indonesia, where it is known only from a small stream a few km east of Danau Bira.

References

Melanotaenia
Freshwater fish of Western New Guinea
Taxonomy articles created by Polbot
Fish described in 1983